Por Amor a Mi Pueblo (Eng.: "For Love of My Town") is the sixteenth and final studio album released by Los Bukis on May 2, 1995. The album was certified gold in the United States by the RIAA. It was nominated for Pop Album of the Year at the Premio Lo Nuestro 1996.

Track listing
All songs written and composed by Marco Antonio Solís except for Por Amor a Mi Pueblo

Chart performance

Sales and certifications

References

External links
 Official website
 Por Amor a Mi Pueblo on amazon.com

1995 albums
Marco Antonio Solís albums
Los Bukis albums
Fonovisa Records albums